Gustavo Silva de Oliveira (born 11 September 2002), commonly known as Gustavo, is a Brazilian professional footballer who plays as an midfielder for Shabab Al Ahli.

Career statistics

Club

References

2002 births
Living people
Brazilian footballers
Brazilian expatriate footballers
Brazil youth international footballers
Association football midfielders
Campeonato Brasileiro Série A players
UAE Pro League players
Ceará Sporting Club players
Sport Club do Recife players
Shabab Al-Ahli Club players
Expatriate footballers in the United Arab Emirates
Brazilian expatriate sportspeople in the United Arab Emirates